Seven ships of the French Navy have borne the name Astrolabe, after the instrument astrolabe

Ships 
  of La Pérouse (1781), a converted fluyt
  was briefly named Astrolabe in 1785
  of Dumont d'Urville (1817), a converted horse-carrying fluyt
 , a 14-gun corvette, was renamed Astrolabe in 1825.
 , a hydrograph ship, lead ship of her class
 , a hydrographic ship, formerly the German Zieten
 , an icebreaker built as Fort Resolution and renamed in 1988
 , an icebreaker built in 2017

See also
 Astrolabe (disambiguation)

Notes and references

Notes

References

Bibliography 
 
 

French Navy ship names